This was the first edition of the tournament. Chase Buchanan and Blaž Rola won the title beating Mitchell Krueger and Eric Quigley in the final 6–4, 4–6, [19–17].

Seeds

Draw

References
 Main Draw

Columbus Challenger - Doubles